Yrjö Armas Valkama (ne Flaming, June 5, 1894 – March 3, 1975) was a Finnish diver who competed in the 1920 Summer Olympics and in the 1924 Summer Olympics. He was born and died in Helsinki.

In 1920 he finished fifth in the plain high diving event. Four years later he was eliminated in the first round of the plain high diving competition.

References

1894 births
1975 deaths
Finnish male divers
Olympic divers of Finland
Divers at the 1920 Summer Olympics
Divers at the 1924 Summer Olympics
Divers from Helsinki